Baron Aldenham, of Aldenham in the county of Hertfordshire, is a title in the Peerage of the United Kingdom that was created on 31 January 1896 for the businessman Hucks Gibbs. He was head of the family firm of Antony Gibbs & Sons (founded by his grandfather Antony Gibbs) and a director and Governor of the Bank of England. Gibbs also briefly sat as a Conservative Member of Parliament for the City of London. His fourth son Herbert Cokayne Gibbs was created Baron Hunsdon of Hunsdon in 1923 (see below).

Lord Aldenham was succeeded by his eldest son, the second Baron. He also represented the City of London in the House of Commons as a Conservative. He was succeeded by his son, the third Baron. On the latter's death in 1939 the barony of Aldenham was inherited by his cousin the second Baron Hunsdon of Hunsdon (see Baron Hunsdon for earlier history of this title). He served as chairman of Antony Gibbs & Sons.  the titles are held by his grandson, the sixth Baron, who succeeded his father in 1986.

Another member of the family to gain distinction was Vicary Gibbs, third son of the first Baron. He was Conservative Member of Parliament for St Albans.

The Barons Wraxall are members of another branch of the Gibbs family; their seat was at Tyntesfield. George Henry Gibbs, father of the first Baron Aldenham, was the elder brother of William Gibbs, grandfather of George Gibbs, 1st Baron Wraxall.

The family seat is Holwell Manor, near Sherborne, Dorset.

Barons Aldenham (1896)
(Henry) Hucks Gibbs, 1st Baron Aldenham (1819–1907)
Alban George Henry Gibbs, 2nd Baron Aldenham (1846–1936)
Gerald Henry Beresford Gibbs, 3rd Baron Aldenham (1879–1939)
Walter Durant Gibbs, 4th Baron Aldenham, 2nd Baron Hunsdon of Hunsdon (1888–1969)
Anthony Durant Gibbs, 5th Baron Aldenham, 3rd Baron Hunsdon of Hunsdon (1922–1986)
Vicary Tyser Gibbs, 6th Baron Aldenham, 4th Baron Hunsdon of Hunsdon (born 1948)

The heir apparent is the present holder's son, Humphrey William Fell Gibbs (born 1989)

Male-line family tree

See also
Baron Hunsdon of Hunsdon
Baron Wraxall

References

Kidd, Charles, Williamson, David (editors). Debrett's Peerage and Baronetage (1990 edition). New York: St Martin's Press, 1990.

  

Baronies in the Peerage of the United Kingdom
 Aldenham
Noble titles created in 1896
Noble titles created for UK MPs